Markkula may refer to:

 Markkula (surname), a Finnish surname
 Markkula Center for Applied Ethics, in California, United States